Arthur Bertrand Gnahoua (born 18 September 1992) is a French footballer who plays as a winger or centre-forward for Morecambe.

Club career 
Gnahoua was born in France and is of Ivorian descent. He moved to England when he was six and grew up in Salford. He was coached and taught how to play football by his brother. In 2003 he was released from the Bolton Wanderers Academy.

He began his senior career in non-league football, joining Macclesfield Town from Stalybridge Celtic in 2012. On 16 January 2015 he signed for CF Gavà and then moved on to Kidderminster Harriers in January 2016, and was their top goal scorer in the 2016–17 season as they reached the National League North play-off semi-finals.

He joined League One side Shrewsbury Town on a free transfer in May 2017, signing a one-year deal with an option for a further year, making his Football League debut on 5 August 2017 as a substitute in a 1−0 victory over Northampton Town. Gnahoua scored his first professional goal in a 3−2 victory over Coventry City in an EFL Trophy group-stage match on 29 August, followed by his first Football League goal - netting a 94th-minute winner in a 2−1 away win at Doncaster Rovers - on 26 September.

His contract with Shrewsbury was extended at the end of the 2017–18 season. He went on loan to Fylde on 26 November 2018.

He signed for Carlisle on 21 January 2019 but missed the rest of the season after getting injured only 27 minutes into his debut. He was released at the end of the season.

Gnahoua re-joined Macclesfield Town in August 2019 on a one-year contract.

Gnahoua re-signed for Bolton Wanderers on 26 September 2020, 17 years after being released from Bolton's Academy. He said he signed for Bolton as it was close to his home, which became an internet meme, with Bolton fans creating the chant "Arthur Gnahoua, he lives down the road!" They also gave him the nickname King Arthur. He made his debut the same day he signed, coming off the bench to replace Nathan Delfouneso in the 65th minute of a 0−2 Home defeat against Newport County. His first goal came on 17 November as he scored Bolton's second goal in a 3–2 win against Newcastle United U21 in the EFL Trophy with his first league goal coming on 13 January 2021 in a 1–1 draw against Exeter City. On 19 May 2021 Bolton announced he would be released at the end of his contract.

On 17 June 2021 newly promoted Morecambe announced they had signed him. Gnahoua signed a new one-year contract with the club in June 2022.

Career statistics

Notes

Honours
Shrewsbury Town
EFL Trophy runner-up: 2017–18

Bolton Wanderers
EFL League Two third-place (promotion): 2020–21

References

External links 

1992 births
Living people
French footballers
French sportspeople of Ivorian descent
Shrewsbury Town F.C. players
CF Gavà players
Kidderminster Harriers F.C. players
Colwyn Bay F.C. players
Macclesfield Town F.C. players
Stalybridge Celtic F.C. players
Bolton Wanderers F.C. players
Morecambe F.C. players
English Football League players
Association football wingers
Association football forwards